Valeska Gert (11 January 1892 – c. 16 March 1978) was a German dancer, pantomime, cabaret artist, actress and pioneering performance artist.

Early life and career
Gert was born as Gertrud Valesca Samosch in Berlin to a Jewish family. She was the eldest daughter of manufacturer Theodor Samosch and Augusta Rosenthal. Exhibiting no interest in academics or office work, she began taking dance lessons at the age of nine. This, combined with her love of ornate fashion, led her to a career in dance and performance art. In 1915, she studied acting with Maria Moissi, and dance with Rita Sacchetto.

World War I had a negative effect on her father's finances, forcing her to rely on herself far more than other bourgeois daughters typically might. As World War I raged, Gert joined a Berliner dance group and created revolutionary satirical dance. Following engagements at the Deutsches Theater and the Tribüne in Berlin, Gert was invited to perform in expressionist plays in Dadaist mixed media art nights. Her performances in Oskar Kokoschka's Hiob (1918), Ernst Toller's Transformation (1919), and Frank Wedekind's Franziska earned her popularity.

In the 1920s, Gert premiered one of her more provocative works, titled "Pause". Performed in between reels at Berlin cinemas, it was intended to draw attention to inactivity, silence, serenity, and stillness amid all the movement and chaos in modern life. She came onstage and literally just stood there. "It was so radical just to go on stage in the cinema and stand there and do nothing," said Wolfgang Mueller. Gert began acting at the Munich Kammerspiele. Also in the 1920s, Gert's other progressive performances included dancing a traffic accident, boxing, or dying. She was revolutionary and radical and never ceased to simultaneously shock and fascinate her audiences. When she danced an orgasm in Berlin in 1922, the audience called the police.

During this time, she performed in the Schall und Rauch cabaret. Gert also launched a tour of her own dances, with titles like Dance in Orange, Boxing, Circus, Japanese Grotesque, Death, and Whore. In addition, she contributed articles for magazines like Die Weltbühne (The World Stage) and the Berliner Tageszeitung (Berline Daily News).

By 1923, Gert focused her work more on film acting than live performance, performing with Andrews Engelmann, Arnold Korff, and others. She performed in G.W. Pabst's Joyless Street in 1925, Diary of a Lost Girl in 1929, and The Threepenny Opera in 1931. In the late 1920s, she returned to the stage with pieces emphasizing Tontänze (Sound Dances), which explored the relationship between movement and sound.

Gert could be by turns grotesque, intense, mocking, pathetic or furious, performing with an anarchic intensity and artistic fearlessness which also recommended her to the Dadaists. Valeska Gert analysed the limits of societal conventions and then expressed with her body the insights that she gained from her analyses.

Exile

London 
In 1933, Gert's Jewish heritage resulted in her being banned from the German stage. Her exile from Germany sent her to London for some time, where she worked both in theatre and film. In London, she worked on the experimental short film Pett and Pott, which long stood as her last movie. While in London, she wed an English writer, Robin Hay Anderson, her second marriage.

United States
In 1938, she emigrated to the United States, where she was cared for by a Jewish refugee community. She found work washing dishes and posing as a nude model. This same year, she hired the 17-year-old Georg Kreisler as a rehearsal pianist to continue focus on cabaret work. By 1941, she had opened the Beggar Bar in New York. It was a cabaret/restaurant that was filled with mismatched furniture. Julian Beck, Judith Malina, and Jackson Pollock worked for her. Tennessee Williams also worked for her for a short time as a busboy, but was fired for refusing to pool his tips. Gert commented that his work was "so sloppy".

By 1944, Gert had relocated to Provincetown, Massachusetts, where she opened Valeska's. Here, she reunited with Tennessee Williams. She told him stories of hiring a 70-year-old midget named Mademoiselle Pumpernickel who became jealous whenever Gert went onstage. During this period, she was called to Provincetown court for throwing garbage out of her window and failing to pay a dance partner. She called upon Williams as a character witness, which he did with pleasure, despite her having fired him. He told incredulous friends that he "simply liked her".

Return to Europe
In 1947 she returned to Europe. After stays in Paris and Zurich, in 1949 she went to Blockaded Berlin, where she opened the cabaret Hexenküche (Witch's Kitchen) in 1948. Following Hexenküche, she opened Ziegenstall (Goat Shed) on the island of Sylt. In the 1960s, she made her comeback in film. In 1965, she had a role in Fellini's Juliet of the Spirits, the success of which caused her to market herself to young German directors in the 1970s. During this period, she played in Rainer Werner Fassbinder's TV series Eight Hours Don't Make a Day and in Volker Schlöndorff's 1976 movie Coup de Grâce.

In 1978, Werner Herzog invited her to play the real estate broker Knock in his remake of Murnau's classic film Nosferatu. The contract was signed March 1 but she died just two weeks later before filming began. On 18 March 1978 neighbors and friends in Kampen, Germany, reported she had not been seen for four days. When her door was forced in the presence of police she was found dead. She is believed to have died on 16 March. She was 86 years old. In 2010, the art of Valeska Gert was presented at the Berlin Museum for Contemporary Art Hamburger Bahnhof, in the exhibition Pause. Bewegte Fragmente (Pause. Fragments in motion). The curators Wolfgang Müller from the art punk band Die Tödliche Doris (The Deadly Doris) and art historian An Paenhuysen included a video Baby showing Gert performing. Baby had been unknown until this show. It was recorded by Erich Mitzka in 1969.

Filmography

Silent 
1918: Colomba (Germany, director: Arzén von Cserépy)
1925: Wood Love (Germany, director: Hans Neumann) - Puck
1925: Joyless Street (Germany, director: Georg Wilhelm Pabst) - Frau Greifer (uncredited)
1926: Nana (Germany / France, director: Jean Renoir after Émile Zola) - Zoe - la femme de chambre
1928: Alraune (Germany, director: Henrik Galeen, after Hanns Heinz Ewers) - Ein Mädchen von der Gasse
1929: Der Tod (Experimental film) (Germany, director: Carl Koch ("Totentanz", part of Brecht's The Baden-Baden Lesson on Consent)
1929: Diary of a Lost Girl (Germany, director: Georg Wilhelm Pabst, nach Margarete Böhme) - The director's wife
1930: Such Is Life (Takový je život) (Germany / Czechoslovakia,) - Waitress
1930: People on Sunday (Germany, director: Robert Siodmak, Rochus Gliese, Edgar G. Ulmer) - Herself

Sound films 
1931: The Threepenny Opera (Germany, director: Georg Wilhelm Pabst) - Mrs. Peachum
1934: Pett and Pott (Short, United Kingdom, director: Alberto Cavalcanti) - The Maid
1939: Rio (United Kingdom, director: John Brahm) - Specialty (uncredited)
1965: Giulietta degli spiriti (Italy / France / West Germany, director: Federico Fellini) - Pijma
1966: La Bonne dame (France, Director: Pierre Philippe)
1973: Eight Hours Don't Make a Day (TV Series, Episode: "Franz und Ernst", West Germany, director: Rainer Werner Fassbinder) - Die andere Oma
1975: Die Betörung der blauen Matrosen (West Germany, director: Ulrike Ottinger) - Ein alter Vogel
1976: Coup de Grâce (West Germany / France, director: Volker Schlöndorff) - Tante Praskovia (final film role)
1977: Nur zum Spaß, nur zum Spiel – Kaleidoskop Valeska Gert (Documentary, West Germany, director: Volker Schlöndorff)

Awards 
 1970: Filmband in Gold for lifelong achievement in German film
 2004: Honoured with a star on the Walk of Fame of Cabaret in Mainz

Bibliography 
Primary sources, Monographs by Valeska Gert
 Valeska Gert: Mein Weg. Leipzig 1931. (2nd ed., self-published, s.l. & s.a., ca. 1950)
 Valeska Gert: Die Bettlerbar von New York. Berlin 1950. (2nd ed., s.l. & s.a., ca. 1958)
 Valeska Gert: Ich bin eine Hexe. Munich 1968 (various editions)
 Valeska Gert: Die Katze von Kampen. Percha 1974
 Valeska Gert: Je suis une sorcière. Kaléidoscope d'une vie dansée. Paris 2004 (Translation of Ich bin eine Hexe, annotated and a foreword by Philippe Ivernel)
 About 20 essays by Valeska Gert are mentioned in F.-M. Peter (1985)

Secondary literature, Monographs about Valeska Gert
 Fred Hildenbrandt: Die Tänzerin Valeska Gert. Stuttgart 1928
 Frank-Manuel Peter: Valeska Gert: Tänzerin, Schauspielerin und Kabarettistin. Eine dokumentarische Biographie. Berlin 1985, 2nd ed. 1987
 Susanne Foellmer: Valeska Gert. Fragmente einer Avantgardistin in Tanz und Schauspiel der 1920er Jahre. Bielefeld 2006. With CD-ROM (Dance films by Gert, Mary Wigman and Niddy Impekoven)
 Solo für ein Mannequin von Grieneisen, Homage to Valeska Gert, audi collage by Peter Eckhart Reichel with Monika Hansen and Gerd Wameling, duo-phon records, 2001
 Wolfgang Müller Valeska Gert. Ästhetik der Präsenzen, written by the founder of the West-Berlin performance group Die Tödliche Doris about the relations between the performances/art of the Proto-Punk Valeska Gert to the Post-Punk scene, Berlin 2010.

Secondary literature, Monographs mentioning Valeska Gert
Valeska Gert's bold new style of dance was recognized early by her contemporaries. Here is a selection of books:
 Paul Nikolaus: Tänzerinnen. Munich (1919)
 Ernst Blass: Das Wesen der neuen Tanzkunst. Weimar 1921.
 Werner Suhr: Das Gesicht des Tanzes. Egestorf near Hamburg 1927

Academic treatment
 Gabriele Brandstetter: Tanz-Lektüren. Körperbilder und Raumfiguren der Avantgarde. Frankfurt a. M. 1995
 Dianne S. Howe: Individuality and Expression – The Aesthetics of the New German Dance, 1908–1936. New York 1996
 Ramsay Burt: Alien bodies: representations of modernity, ‚race' and nation in early modern dance. New York 1998
 Christiane Kuhlmann: Bewegter Körper – Mechanischer Apparat. Zur medialen Verschränkung von Tanz und Fotografie in den 1920er Jahren. Frankfurt a. M. 2003
 Yvonne Hardt: Politische Körper. Ausdruckstanz, Choreografien des Protests und die Arbeiterkulturbewegung in der Weimarer Republik. Münster 2004
 Amelie Soyka: "Lauter zischende kleine Raketen: Valeska Gert". In: Dies. (ed.): Tanzen, tanzen und nichts als tanzen. Tänzerinnen der Moderne von Josephine Baker bis Mary Wigman. Berlin 2004, p. 123–137
 Alexandra Kolb: "So watt war noch nie da!!!" Valeska Gert's Performances in the Context of Weimar Culture, The European Legacy 2007 (12/3), pp. 293–309
 Kate Elswit: "Back Again? Valeska Gert's Exiles". In: New German Dance Studies. Illinois 2012, p. 113-129
 Kristen Hylenski: "'Ich will leben, auch wenn ich tot bin': Valeska Gert's Autobiographical Legacy." German Life and Letters 66.1 (2013): 39-54.
 Kristen Hylenski: "'Kaleidoskop meines Lebens': Valeska Gert's Performances of the Self."  Colloquia Germanica 42.4 (2009): 289-306.

Secondäry literature, in Biographies
 Hans-Juergen Fink & Michael Seufert: Georg Kreisler gibt es gar nicht – Die Biographie. Frankfurt am Main 2005, p.  96–97

References

External links
 
 Photos of Valeska Gert
 

1892 births
1978 deaths
20th-century German actresses
Expressionist dancers
German artists' models
German emigrants to England
German female dancers
German stage actresses
German film actresses
German silent film actresses
Actresses from Berlin
Date of death missing
German emigrants to the United States
Jewish emigrants from Nazi Germany to the United States
Jewish artists
Jewish women artists